Luigi Durand de la Penne (D 560) is the lead ship of the Durand de la Penne-class destroyer of the Italian Navy.

Development  
The Durand de Le Penne-class are escort and combat class ships, able to operate in every combat condition, and especially devised to survive to heavy missile and aircraft attacks. Its construction is made almost totally with steel; the structure is a continuous deck with a low, large stern, to accommodate the helicopter force. The fore hull is very pointed, with a very pronounced sea-cutter structure. The superstructure consists of two blocks, relatively low and wide, both with a high, antenna mast with a triangular cross-section for all the electronic. The engines exhausts are in two groups, one for each superstructure: the aft has two exhausts flank to flank, slightly inclined. Then there is the Standard missile system and finally the helicopter facilities.

Construction and career 
She is laid down on 20 January 1988 and launched on 20 October 1989 by Fincantieri shipyards. Commissioned on 18 March 1993 with the hull number D 560.

Luigi Durand de la Penne entered Odessa Port, Ukraine on 4 September 2019. She met the cadets at Odesa Maritime Academy.

25 August 2020, Luigi Durand de la Penne conducted an exercise with TCG Goksu in the Eastern Mediterranean Sea.

References

External links
 Destroyer Durand de la Penne Marina Militare website
 

Durand de la Penne-class destroyers
1989 ships
Ships built by Fincantieri